Salote Yaya is a Fijian footballer. She has been a member of the Fiji women's national team.

Yaya is from Savusavu and was educated at St Bede's College.

In 2006 she was a member of the Fiji women's national under-20 football team. She then became a referee and in 2010 helped referee the Fiji FACT and Battle of the Giants. She rejoined the national team for the 2011 Pacific Games in Nouméa, which won bronze.

Notes

References

Living people
Fijian women's footballers
Fiji women's international footballers
Year of birth missing (living people)
Women's association footballers not categorized by position